Dynamical genetics concerns the study and the interpretation of those phenomena in which physiological enzymatic protein complexes alter the DNA, in a more or less sophisticated way.

The study of such mechanisms is important firstly since they promote useful functions, as for example the immune system recombination (on individual scale) and the crossing-over (on evolutionary scale); secondly since they may sometimes become harmful because of some malfunctioning, causing for example neurodegenerative disorders.

Typical examples of dynamical genetics subjects are:
dynamic mutations, term introduced by Robert I. Richards and Grant R. Sutherland to indicate mutations caused by other mutations; this phenomenon often involves the variable number tandem repeats, closely related to many neurodegenerative diseases, as the trinucleotide repeat disorders (interpreted by Anita Harding).
dynamic genome, term introduced by Nina Fedoroff and David Botstein to indicate the transposition discovered by Barbara McClintock.
immune V(D)J recombination (discovered by Susumu Tonegawa) and isotype class switching, terms introduced to indicate two kinds of immune system recombinations, which are the main cause of the enormous variety of antibodies.
horizontal DNA transfer (discovered by Frederick Griffith) that indicates the DNA transfer between two organisms.
crossing-over (discovered by Thomas Hunt Morgan) mediated by formation and unwinding (by means of peculiar enzymatic complexes such as  helicase) of uncommon four-helix DNA structures known as G-quadruplexes (discovered by Martin Gellert, Marie N. Lipsett, and David R. Davies).

References

Genetics